International Horticultural Expo Garden is a station on Line 11 of the Qingdao Metro. It opened on 23 April 2018. It will be an interchange station with the East extension of Line 2.

References

Qingdao Metro stations
Railway stations in China opened in 2018